The Babai revolt was an insurrection in the Sultanate of Rûm in the thirteenth century.

Background 
The Sultanate of Rûm was a medieval state in Anatolia founded by Seljuqs whose ancestors were converted to Islam since 11th century AD and entered Anatolia after 1071. Although initially a part of the Great Seljuk Empire, it lasted longer than the Great Seljuks, reaching its apogee during the reign of Alaattin Keykubat I. But in the mid-13th century, Seljuks faced the problem of refugees. The Mongols had defeated the Khwarazm Empire at the east, and Oghuz Turk clans were escaping from the Turkistan area to Anatolia. These clans were nomadic and mostly Tengriist, i.e. non Muslim. The Seljuk sultan Gıyaseddin Keyhüsrev II attempted to settle these people in Southeast Anatolia (Asiatic part of modern Turkey), but they defied his diktat. They started to convert to Islam, but their interpretation of Islam was more tolerant than that of the settled population, and they were regarded as heretics. However they were supported by the nomadic Turkmens of Central Anatolia who had migrated earlier than the newcomers but had the same problems.

The revolt 
Gıyasettin had ceded power to his ministers, notably Sadettin Köpek who was suspicious of a rebellion from Afshar immigrants who had settled in Anatolia, migrating from Persia after the Mongol invasion. He accordingly imprisoned the suspects which led to their movement towards Aleppo (Syria) in Ismaili dominated areas. He had the leaders of Khwārazm people (like Kirkhan) imprisoned. The revolt began in 1239 around Samsat (in modern Adıyaman Province), and spread quickly to Central Anatolia. Baba Ishak who led the revolt was a follower of Baba İlyas, the kadı (judge) of Kayseri. He declared himself Âmīr’ūl-Mu’minīn Sadr’ûd-Dūnya wa’d-Dīn and Rāss’ūl-Allāh. Although the Seljuk governor of Malatya tried to suppress the revolt he was defeated by the revolutionaries around Elbistan (in modern Kahramanmaraş Province). The revolutionaries captured the important cities of Sivas, Kayseri and Tokat in Central and North Anatolia. The governor of Amasya killed Baba Ishak in 1240, but this did not mean the end of the revolt. The revolutionaries marched on Konya, the capital. The sultan saw that his army could not suppress the revolt, and he hired mercenaries of French origin. The revolutionaries were defeated in a decisive battle on the Malya plains near Kırşehir.

Bābā Eliyās al-Khorāsānī
Bābā Eliyās al-Khorāsānī († 1240) was an influential mystic from Eastern Persia, who was the murshid of Aybak Bābā who in turn was the murshid of one of the leading actors of the Babais Rebellion, namely Bābā Ishāq Kafarsudī as well. Eventually, Bābā Eliyās Khorāsānī was held responsible for the insurrection organized by Bābā Ishāq Kafarsudī, and consequently executed by Mūbārez’ūd-Dīn-ee Armāğān-Shāh, the supreme commander-in-chief of the armies of the Anadolu Selçuklu Devleti (Sultanate of Rum).

Aftermath 
The revolt was suppressed with much bloodshed. But with the diversion of resources needed to suppress the revolt, the Seljuk army was severely affected. The defence of the eastern provinces was largely ignored, and most of Anatolia was plundered. The Seljuks lost the valuable trade colony in the Crimea, on the north of the Black Sea. The Mongol commander Bayju saw this as an opportunity to occupy East Anatolia, and in 1242 he captured Erzurum. In 1243, he defeated Keyhüsrev's army in the battle of Kösedağ, and the Seljuks became vassals of the Mongols.

See also
 Bābā Ishāq Kafarsudī
 Dada Kārkğın 
 Ebû'l-Bakā Bābā Elyās 
 The Bābāīs

References 

Conflicts in 1239
Conflicts in 1240
13th-century rebellions
Sultanate of Rum
History of Turkey
Rebellions in Asia
Oghuz Turks
Alevism
Islam in Turkey